GAPPS may refer to:

 Global Alliance to Prevent Prematurity and Stillbirth
 Google Apps, now Google Workspace
 Google Mobile Services

See also
 Gaps (disambiguation)